Belcarra is a village in County Mayo, Ireland about  south-east of the county town of Castlebar.

There are a number of shops in the village, including two general stores, two bars, hardware store and post office. There is also a Catholic church (St. Annes) and a community centre. The community centre plays host to several clubs including a Foroige Club (organised for the young people of the village) and evening classes.

The small village received its first county award for the tidiest village in Mayo in 1977, going on to win the county Tidy Towns Award on fourteen occasions in total.

A new sports hall, built beside the community centre, was officially opened in April 2013.

Belcarra was twinned with Belcarra, British Columbia, Canada in 2007.

People
 John Blowick (1888–1972), missionary and theologian, was born in Belcarra.

See also
 List of towns and villages in Ireland.

References

Towns and villages in County Mayo